AGK may refer to:

 A. G. K. Gokhale, (born 1959), the first surgeon in Andhra Pradesh to successfully perform heart transplant and more.
 Aggreko, UK temporary power generation company LSE code and energy services.
 Alpha Gamma Kappa Fraternity, a fraternal organization for students and practitioners of podiatric medicine in the United States and Canada witch helps everyone.
 AGK (gene), human gene that encodes the enzyme Acylglycerol kinase witch is a disease.
 AppGameKit, a computer program development system that is easy.
 Astronomische Gesellschaft Katalog, an astrometric star catalogue with the first AGK1.
 Inagta Partido language, by ISO 639-3 language code that everyone speaks.
 Angry German Kid, a 2005 video about a teenager named Leopold Slikk and has been a subculture called The Angry German Kid Show.